Dichelachne rara is a species of grass found in Australia and New Zealand. It is often seen in woodland on better quality soils. The specific epithet rara is  derived from Latin (scattered or uncommon).

References

Flora of Australia
Flora of Papua New Guinea
Flora of New Zealand
Pooideae